Half Written Story is the second extended play (EP) by American singer and songwriter Hailee Steinfeld, released on May 8, 2020, through Republic Records. It is considered the first half of a two-piece project, being supplemented by her upcoming third EP that was initially scheduled to be released in summer 2020. Also, it is Steinfeld's first release since her debut EP Haiz in November 2015. The EP is supported by two singles, "Wrong Direction" and "I Love You's".

Background and recording
After the release of Haiz, Steinfeld began recording new music for an album project in January 2017 while filming Pitch Perfect 3. That year, Steinfeld released the singles "Most Girls" and "Let Me Go" that were intended to be a part of the album. In March 2018, Steinfeld confirmed that she was finishing her album and intended to release it in 2018. The following December, after the album wasn't released, Steinfeld confirmed that after finishing filming Dickinson in January 2019, she would be "finishing what [she] started" with her music and releasing the album in 2019.

On March 26, 2020, it was reported that Steinfeld would release a two-part project in 2020 with the first part being released on May 1, 2020. Steinfeld later announced on April 24, 2020 that the project's first part's release was being pushed to May 8, 2020, due to her needing more time to perfect it. The project's first part was finished that month. On April 27, 2020, Steinfeld announced that the project's first part would be called Half Written Story as well as revealing its cover art and track list. The EP got its name from a lyrics in "Your Name Hurts" saying "we're a half-written story without any ending" and "this half-written story is horror at best".

Music and lyrics
Half Written Story is primarily a pop music record with lyrics that discuss heartbreak and strength. The EP contains five tracks. It opens with "I Love You's" an upbeat romantic pop anthem about self love and hope. Sampling "No More I Love You's" by Annie Lennox, the song's production consists of "floaty" synths and "peppy" beats. "Your Name Hurts" is a retro R&B track that according to Steinfeld is about when "a person's name can go from [making] your heart skip a beat to something that makes you feel nauseous." "End This (L.O.V.E.)" is a "minor-key lament" where Steinfeld was inspired by Bea Miller's "S.L.U.T." to make a song with an abbreviation that has a flipped meaning. The song samples the melody from "L-O-V-E" by Nat King Cole and sees Steinfeld singing in a lower range. "Man Up" is a hip hop-influenced pop-rap song that "coheres into a believably messy portrait of love's aftermath". The closing track and lead single, "Wrong Direction" is an "emotional" tearjerker piano ballad that addresses a past relationship.

Singles
"Wrong Direction" was released as the EP's lead single on January 1, 2020. It was followed by "I Love You's" on March 26, 2020.

Critical reception
Half Written Story received mixed reviews from critics. Chris DeVille of Stereogum complimented the EP's improvement of Steinfeld's music stating "Half Written Story presents a slightly more fully-formed vision of Steinfeld the singer" and "together [Koz] and Steinfeld have constructed a collection that, if not exactly brimming with idiosyncrasies, conveys more of the charm and sass that typify her onscreen work". Steve Baltin of Forbes called the EP "stellar" as well as writing "When you hear her intimate, her attitude in the joyous pop, the production and the passion she brings to the first five songs it is clear her love of music is genuine". Natalie Weiner of Variety criticized the EP's choice of songs writing "The desire to make a meatier banger is clearly there, given how long she’s been at it and the kind of material she chooses; she has the voice and the baseline taste level. It’s hard to imagine, though, that any of these songs will make her a recognizable force in pop." Jason Lipshutz of Billboard also criticized the EP's choice of songs writing "none of the songs sound like surefire radio staples" but also complimented the EP writing "the five new songs are the most experimental, and personal, of Steinfeld's career." Writing for i-D, Douglas Greenwood called the EP a "belter" as well as saying it's a "searingly honest mini collection of proper pop songs." Mathias Rosenzweig of V called it "a raw and emotive body of work for the starlet". Katrina Rees of CelebMix gave a favourable review writing "Half Written Story is a cohesive offering which showcases Hailee’s growth as an artist" and "Hailee has delivered an impressive EP which exhibits confidence and vulnerability in equal measure."

Track listing

Notes
 "I Love You's" samples "No More I Love You's" by Annie Lennox, written by Joseph Hughes and David Freeman.
 "End This (L.O.V.E.)" samples the melody from "L-O-V-E" by Nat King Cole, written by Bert Kaempfert and Milt Gabler.

Credits and personnel
Credits adapted from Tidal, Instagram, and Universal Music Canada.

Performers

 Hailee Steinfeld – vocals
 Elizabeth Lowell Boland – backing vocals , piano 
 Todd Clark – backing vocals 
 Caroline Pennell – backing vocals 
 Skyler Stonestreet – backing vocals 
 Koz – drums , bass synthesizer 
 Hrag Sanbalian – synthesizer

Technical

 Koz – executive production, production, programming 
 David Stewart – production, programming 
 D'Mile – production, programming 
 The 23rd – production, programming 
 John Hanes – engineering, studio personnel 
 Matt Snell – assistant recording engineering, studio personnel 
 Phil Hotz – assistant recording engineering, studio personnel 
 Drew Jurecka – string arranging 
 Serban Ghenea – mixing, studio personnel 
 Matty Green – mixing, studio personnel 
 Josh Gudwin – mixing, studio personnel 
 Jamie Snell – mixing, studio personnel 
 Ewan Vickery – assistant mixing, studio personnel 
 Randy Merrill – mastering, studio personnel

Design
 Allison Snyder – creative direction
 Julie Vastola – creative direction
 Juan Manuel Villarreal – design
 Danna Galeano – animation
 Katia Temkin – animation

Charts

Release history

References

Hailee Steinfeld albums
Republic Records EPs
2020 EPs